Tecumseh Junior – Senior High School is a dual public high school and junior high school in Lynnville, Indiana.  Its athletic nickname is the "Braves", and it participates in the Pocket Athletic Conference, although in 2007 the football program left the conference and began playing independently. It is a grade 7-12 education facility operated by the Warrick County School Corporation. The campus sits in between the towns of Lynnville and Elberfeld, the towns from which students attend. Students from the town of Selvin also attend THS.

The school was named after the now-defunct Tecumseh coal mines  outside of Lynnville, which were operated by Peabody Coal Company, now Peabody Energy.

Tecumseh High School was created in 1965 as a result of the consolidation of Lynnville High School and Elberfeld High School. Selvin High School had been folded into Lynnville in 1962.  From 1965-1982, Tecumseh was a 9-12 high school located in the former Lynnville High School building.  Grades 7-8 had been housed at Lynnville Elementary School and Elberfeld Elementary School.   A new building, which houses grades 7-12, opened in 1982, and the name was formally changed to "Tecumseh Junior - Senior High School."

A plan in 2008 to move grade 6 to the facility to make Tecumseh a middle-high school by 2011 faced opposition and wasn't implemented.  The proposed move would have brought Tecumseh into line with the school corporation's desire to move from a junior high to middle school concept countywide.  The concept was implemented at the remaining county schools.

Facilities
The campus consists of a main school building, tennis courts, a softball field, greenhouse, baseball training buildings, and a house and barn in the back. 
The school is divided into 2 and a half levels, the upper levels mainly reserved for upperclassmen and the lower reserved for the junior high students. The wood shop and agriculture classes, the cafeteria and pool are located on the mid-level.  The art class is located on the lower level.  A family and consumer sciences (formerly known as home economics) classroom is located on the upper level.  This school has no elevator, but is ADA compliant with a large ramp.    
A new sports complex is being built behind the school was completed in 2014.
The school's track, football field, and baseball field are still located near the former high school location in the town of Lynnville (3 miles away) and next to Lynnville Elementary School.

See also
 List of high schools in Indiana

References

External links
 Official website

Educational institutions established in 1982
High schools in Southwestern Indiana
Pocket Athletic Conference
Schools in Warrick County, Indiana
Public high schools in Indiana
Public middle schools in Indiana
1982 establishments in Indiana